Africotriton is a genus of sea snails, marine gastropod mollusks in the family Cancellariidae, the nutmeg snails.

Species
Species within the genus Africotriton include:
 Africotriton adelphum Bouchet & Petit, 2002
 Africotriton carinapex Beu & Maxwell, 1987
 Africotriton crebriliratus (G.B. Sowerby III, 1903)
 Africotriton fictilis (Hinds, 1844a)
 Africotriton kilburni Beu & Maxwell, 1987
 Africotriton multinodulatus Beu & Maxwell, 1987
 Africotriton petiti Beu & Maxwell, 1987

References

 Beu A.G. & Maxwell P.A. (1987) A revision of the fossil and living gastropods related to Plesiotriton Fischer, 1884 (Family Cancellariidae, Subfamily Plesiotritoninae n. subfam.). With an appendix: Genera of Buccinidae Pisaniinae related to Colubraria Schumacher, 1817. New Zealand Geological Survey Paleontological Bulletin 54:1-140
 Hemmen J. (2007). Recent Cancellariidae. Wiesbaden, 428pp

Cancellariidae
Gastropod genera